This is a list of solar car racing teams.

Australia

Belgium

Brazil

Canada

Chile

Colombia

Denmark

France

Germany

Greece

India

Iran

Italy

Jordan

Japan

Indonesia

Malaysia

Morocco

The Netherlands

Pakistan

Poland

Puerto Rico

Saudi Arabia

South Africa

Sweden

Switzerland

Turkey

United Arab Emirates

United Kingdom

United States

Venezuela

New Zealand

See also

World Solar Challenge 
North American Solar Challenge

References

Solar car
Engineering education
Solar car teams
Solar